"One Heart" is a song by German house trio R.I.O. The song was written by Yann Peifer, Sven Petersen, Manuel Reuter, Andres Ballinas and D. Alexander. It was released in the Netherlands as a digital download on 2 March 2010.

Track listing
Digital download
 "One Heart" (Dutch Radio Edit) – 3:13 
 "One Heart" (Extended Mix) – 5:37

Credits and personnel
Lead vocals  - Tony T.
Producers – Yann Peifer, Manuel Reuter
Lyrics – Yann Peifer, Sven Petersen, Manuel Reuter, Andres Ballinas, D. Alexander
Label: Spinnin Records

Charts

Release history

References

2010 singles
R.I.O. songs
2010 songs
Eurodance songs
Songs written by Yanou
Spinnin' Records singles
Songs written by DJ Manian
Songs written by Andres Ballinas